Saeed Mohammad ( Standard Persian pronunciation: , born 2 March 1969) is an Iranian executive director and second brigadier general in the Islamic Revolutionary Guard Corps. He is Advisor to the President of Iran since 2021 and former commander of its Khatam-al Anbiya Construction Headquarters who has a PhD in Civil engineering from Tarbiat Modares University.

He was a presidential candidate in 2021 presidential election, but his nomination was rejected by Guardian Council.

Life and career

Saeed Mohammad was born in 1968 in Tehran and spent his childhood and adolescence in this city. He joined the Islamic Revolutionary Guard Corps in 1987 at the age of 19. In 2009, he received a PhD in Civil Engineering (Road and Transportation) from Tarbiat Modares University. Mohammad's activities in the Revolutionary Guards Corps can be summarized only in the managerial and executive sectors, in the companies under the Khatam al-Anbia Construction Camp, and for a short period in the IRGC Cooperative Foundation. From 2007 to 2014, he was the CEO of Sepasad Group (affiliated to Khatam Camp) and from 2018 to March 2021, he was the Commander of Khatam Al-Anbia Construction Camp and holds the military rank of Brigadier General of the Revolutionary Guards.

See also 

 Khatam-al Anbiya Construction Headquarters

References

1968 births
Living people
Islamic Revolutionary Guard Corps officers
Tarbiat Modares University alumni
Academic staff of Imam Hossein University
Islamic Revolutionary Guard Corps second brigadier generals